The Buyunda is a river in Magadan Oblast, Russian Far East.

Together with the Seymchan that flows roughly southwards on the facing bank of the Kolyma basin, the Buyunda forms the Seymchan-Buyunda Depression, which limits the Upper Kolyma Highlands from the east.

The name of the Buyunda originated in the Evenki language, meaning "where there are wild deer".

Course 
The Buyunda is the seventh longest tributary of the Kolyma. It has its sources in the Kilgan Massif and heads roughly northwards across the mountainous area of the Maymandzhin Range. After entering the depression it meanders strongly across a wide and marshy floodplain, its main channel dividing into branches. Finally the river joins the right bank of the Kolyma  from its mouth. Its confluence with the Kolyma is  100 km below the Ust-Srednekan Hydroelectric Station. Seymchan settlement and the mouth of river Seymchan are located further downstream on the facing bank.

The river is frozen between late October and late May. The main tributaries of the Buyunda are the Bolshaya Kupka and lower Elgen from the right and the upper Elgen, Talaya, Khurchan and Gerba from the left. There are over 1,550 lakes in the basin of the river.

Fauna
Loach, grayling, whitefish, burbot and lenok are the main fish species found in the waters of the Buyunda.

See also
List of rivers of Russia

References

External links
Picture of the Buyunda
Kolyma - Modern Guidebook to Magadan Oblast 
Detail of the Buyunda fan and the fault trace across it
ResearchGate - The Ulakhan fault in the Magadan and Yakutsk regions
Rivers of Magadan Oblast